"Mic Check" is a song by American rapper Juelz Santana, released as the first single from his second studio album What the Game's Been Missing! (2005). The song's instrumental is based around a sample of "The Roots Mural Theme" by Quincy Jones.

Critical reception
Steve Juon of RapReviews praised Santana's vocal performance on "Mic Check" as an example of "the Santana rap fans are looking for – the one who's a little bit clever with punchlines, who times his flow to go on and off beat purposefully, the one who has a brash personality and sounds like he could dominate the game given half a chance."

Charts

References

2005 singles
Juelz Santana songs
Def Jam Recordings singles
Songs written by Juelz Santana
2004 songs
Songs written by Quincy Jones